Suresh Kumar Rana (alias Suresh Kumar) is a politician based in western Uttar Pradesh. He was a member of the 16th Legislative Assembly of Uttar Pradesh and is currently a member of 17th Legislative Assembly of Uttar Pradesh in the northern state of India. He represents the Thana Bhawan constituency of Uttar Pradesh and is a member of the Bharatiya Janata Party. Rana has previously served as a Minister of State (Independent Charge) in the Uttar Pradesh Government and currently holds the position of a  Cabinet Minister in the Yogi Adityanath led Government and holds the portfolios of sugarcane development and sugarcane mills.

Early life and education
Suresh Rana was born in Thana Bhawan, Shamli in 1970 in a Rajput family. As per his election affidavit, Rana is 12th pass. Prior to entering politics, he was an agriculturist by profession.

Muzaffarnagar Riots

In November 2015 a bailable warrant was issued against Rana for violating prohibitory orders and instigating communal tension during the 2013 Muzaffarnagar riots. According to NDTV, Rana was charged with 

In December 2015, Rana surrendered before a Muzzafarnagar court after the court issued a bailable warrant against him.

On 30 January 2017, a case was filed against Rana for hate speech after claiming that he would impose a curfew on Kairana, Deoband, and Moradabad if he won in the upcoming 2017 Assembly elections. The next day, another case was filed against him for violating electoral conduct after laying down a foundation stone with his name on it on a newly built road in Goherpur village in Shamli district.

Political career 
Suresh Rana has been a MLA for two terms. Rana represents Thana Bhawan constituency and is a member of the Bharatiya Janata Party.

He got the ministries of Cane Development and Sugar Mills, Industrial development.

Posts Held

See also
Thana Bhawan
Uttar Pradesh Legislative Assembly
Government of India
Politics of India
Bharatiya Janata Party

References 

1970 births
Living people
Uttar Pradesh MLAs 2017–2022
Bharatiya Janata Party politicians from Uttar Pradesh
People from Shamli district
2013 Muzaffarnagar violence
Yogi ministry
Uttar Pradesh MLAs 2012–2017
Indian Hindus
Indian politicians
Indian politicians convicted of crimes